Mohammed Eshan Zia is the former Minister of Rural Rehabilitation and Development of Afghanistan. He is currently President and CEO of Tadbeer Consulting Inc.

Background
Zia was born in Kabul, Afghanistan. He received a Bachelor's Degree in Social Development from the University of Birmingham in the UK in 1991, and holds a master's degree in Post-War Recovery Studies from the University of York. During the 1990s he worked with Aid Agencies and NGO's involved in humanitarian and post conflict programs in Afghanistan.

Minister of Rural Rehabilitation and Development
During the First Karzai cabinet, he joined the Ministry of Rural Rehabilitation and Development as policy advisor in 2002 and subsequently was appointed Deputy Minister for Programs in January 2004, becoming responsible for a developmentbudget of over 300 mln dollar. He became Rural Development Minister in 2006, but was replaced in 2010 when the Second Karzai cabinet was installed.

Mr. Zia was described by The Globe and Mail as one of the most active and dynamic of the Afghan cabinet, known for getting out of Kabul and pushing hard to drive reconstruction money out to the communities where projects are picked by locally chosen councils. According to the website of de ministry of rural rehabilitation and development, the soft-spoken Mr. Zia was the most-traveled minister of the Karzai cabinet, and possibly also the most popular.

Cornerstone of the Ministry of Rural Development was the National Solidarity Program, a project that gives money to local communities who have elected their own leaders and created their own development efforts.

After his tenure as minister, Zia became CEO of Tadbeer, an Afghan consulting firm in the governance, development and security field.

References

Year of birth missing (living people)
Living people
Government ministers of Afghanistan
Alumni of the University of Birmingham
People from Kabul
Alumni of the University of York